Rico Rodrigus Mack (born February 22, 1971) is a former American football linebacker who played one season with the Pittsburgh Steelers of the National Football League. He played college football at Appalachian State University and attended Winder-Barrow High School in Winder, Georgia. He was also a member of the Chicago Bears, Amsterdam Admirals, St. Louis Rams, Buffalo Destroyers and Los Angeles Xtreme.

References

External links
Just Sports Stats

1971 births
Living people
People from Barrow County, Georgia
Sportspeople from the Atlanta metropolitan area
Players of American football from Georgia (U.S. state)
African-American players of American football
American football linebackers
Appalachian State Mountaineers football players
Pittsburgh Steelers players
Amsterdam Admirals players
Buffalo Destroyers players
Los Angeles Xtreme players
21st-century African-American sportspeople
20th-century African-American sportspeople